This is a list of the Zimbabwe national football team results from 2000 to 2019.

2000s head-to-head record
Last match updated was against  Namibia on 11 November 2017.

Source: Soccerway

2000s

2000

Source: Soccerway

2001

Source: Soccerway

2002

Source: Soccerway

2003

Source: Soccerway

2004

Source: Soccerway

2005

Source: Soccerway

2006

Source: Soccerway

2007

Source: Soccerway

2008

Source: Soccerway

2009

Source: Soccerway

2010s

2010

Source: Soccerway

2011

Source: Soccerway

2012

Source: Soccerway

2013

Source: Soccerway

2014

Source: Soccerway

2015

Source: Soccerway

2016

Source: Soccerway

2017

Source: Soccerway

2018

2019

Source: Soccerway

2000s home venues
.

Source: Soccerway

See also
 Asiagate – A match fixing scandal involving several Zimbabwe national football team friendly matches in Asia.

Notes

References

2000s in Zimbabwe
2010s in Zimbabwe
2000s